The Claremore Daily Progress is a newspaper published twice per week (print) and three times per week (electronic edition)  in Claremore, Oklahoma, United States.  Founded on June 29, 1892, it also sometimes covers the communities of Catoosa, Chelsea, Inola, Oologah, Tacora Hills, Pryor, Oklahoma, Twin Oaks and Verdigris in Rogers County, Oklahoma.

The Progress editorial staff includes News Editor Chelsea Weeks, Staff Writer Jennifer Maupin, and Sports Editor Kevin Green.

The newspaper maintains a news website.

References

External links
 Claremore Daily Progress Website
 CNHI Website

Newspapers published in Oklahoma
Rogers County, Oklahoma